Harris Park railway station is located on the Main Western line, serving the Sydney suburb of Harris Park. It is served by Sydney Trains T1 Western Line T2 Inner West & Leppington Line and T5 Cumberland Line services.

History
Harris Park station opened in the late 1800s. Originally built as two side platforms, both were rebuilt as island platforms during the quadruplication of the Granville to Westmead line in the mid-1980s. On 2 November 1996, the Harris Park to Merrylands Y-Link opened allowing direct train operation between these two stations by what is now known as the Cumberland Line.

On 30 June 2013, a landslide occurred and a retaining wall collapsed in heavy rain, burying one track and partially covering platform 4.

An accessibility upgrade, including lift access to the station, was announced in 2015.

Platforms & services

Track plan

References

External links

Harris Park station details Transport for New South Wales

Easy Access railway stations in Sydney
Main Western railway line, New South Wales
Railway stations in Sydney
Harris Park, New South Wales